Mark Vishik started his seminar at Moscow State University in the spring of 1961,
at the suggestion of I. M. Gelfand.
The seminar ran on Mondays in Room 13-06 of the main building of Moscow State University, starting at 18:00 (initially at 16:00) and lasting for several hours.
It featured talks of many world class mathematicians from Russia, France, and other countries.
Traditionally, the speakers of the seminars were guests at M. I. Vishik's apartment on the Sunday night, before the seminar.
The seminar ran for more than 50 years, until Mark Vishik's death in June 2012.

Mark Iosifovich considered this seminar one of the main achievements of his life.
This seminar collected the color of the mathematical community, and speaking at its meetings was considered a great honour.

Talks during the last, 2011–2012 academic year

See also 
Séminaire Nicolas Bourbaki
French mathematical seminars

References

External links 
 Mark Vishik's seminar

Moscow State University
Mathematics conferences